Immilla (also Emilia, Immula, Ermengard or Irmgard) (born c.1020, died January 1078) was a duchess consort of Swabia by marriage to Otto III, Duke of Swabia, and a margravine of Meissen by marriage to Ekbert I of Meissen. She was regent of Meissen during the minority of her son Ekbert II.

Life
Immilla was the daughter of Ulric Manfred II of Turin and Bertha of Milan and thereby a member of the Arduinici dynasty. Her older sister was Adelaide of Susa.

Her first husband was Otto III, Duke of Swabia, whom she married c.1036. After Otto's death in September 1057, Immilla married again (c.1058). Her second husband was Ekbert I of Meissen.

In 1067, shortly before his death, Ekbert I attempted to repudiate Immilla in order to marry Adela of Louvain, daughter of Lambert II, Count of Louvain and the widow of Otto I, Margrave of Meissen. After Ekbert's death in 1068, Immilla spent some time at the imperial court with her niece Bertha, before returning to Italy. It is possible that she acted as regent for her young son, Ekbert II, at this time.

Immilla died in Turin in January 1078. She is sometimes said to have become a nun before her death.

Marriages and children
With her first husband, Otto, Immilla had five daughters:
Bertha (or Alberada) (died 1 April 1103), married firstly Herman II, Count of Kastl, and married secondly Frederick, Count of Kastl
Gisela, inherited Kulmbach and Plassenburg, married Arnold IV, Count of Andechs
Judith (died 1104), married firstly Conrad I, Duke of Bavaria, and secondly Botho, Count of Pottenstein
Eilika, abbess of Niedermünster
Beatrice (1040–1140), inherited Schweinfurt, married Henry II, Count of Hildrizhausen and Margrave of the Nordgau

With her second husband, Ekbert I, Immilla had the following children:
Ekbert II
Gertrude

References
H. Bresslau, Jahrbücher des Deutschen Reichs unter Konrad II., 2 vols. (1884), accessible online at: archive.org
C.W. Previté-Orton, The Early History of the House of Savoy (1000-1233) (Cambridge, 1912), accessible online at:  archive.org
S. Hellmann, Die Grafen von Savoyen und das Reich: bis zum Ende der staufischen Periode (Innsbruck, 1900), accessible online (but without page numbers) at: Genealogie Mittelalter
L. Fenske, Adelsopposition und kirchliche Reformbewegung im östlichen Sachsen. Entstehung und Wirkung des sächsischen Widerstandes gegen das salische Königtum während des Investiturstreites (1977).

External links
Epistolae: Medieval Women's Latin Letters: Immilla of Turin (brief biography and English translation of a legal document issued by Immilla)
Medieval Lands Project: Northern Italy, 900–1100.
Irmgard von Turin, Gräfin von Braunschweig, Markgräfin von Schweinfurt (in German)

Notes

|-

Nobility from Turin
11th-century women rulers
11th-century Italian nobility
11th-century German nobility
11th-century German women
Margravines of Germany
Margravines of Meissen
German duchesses
Duchesses of Swabia
11th-century Italian women
1078 deaths
Remarried royal consorts